Donald Sidney-Fryer (born September 8, 1934) is a poet and entertainer principally influenced by Edmund Spenser and Clark Ashton Smith.

Born and raised in the Atlantic coastal community of New Bedford, Massachusetts, Sidney-Fryer enlisted in the United States Marine Corps in October 1953. While in the Marines, he first became enamored of "imaginative literature" and began to compile A Checklist of the Ballet Scores of Cesare Pugni, eventually published in 1961 as Vol. VIII of Enciclopedia dello Spettacolo. Following his honorable discharge at the rank of sergeant in August 1956, he moved to California, where he enrolled at the University of California, Los Angeles; during this period, he engaged in the concomitant study of classical ballet, working under David Lichine and Tatiana Riaboushinska for a year. 

In 1958 and 1959, he visited Clark Ashton Smith's home in Monterey, California; during these two excursions, Smith introduced him to the oeuvre of George Sterling. After graduating from UCLA in January 1961 with a B.A. in French and the death of Smith in August of that year, Sidney-Fryer commenced work on the poetry that would eventually comprise Songs and Sonnets Atlantean (1971) and The Emperor of Dreams (1976), a bibliography of Smith completed in 1965. From 1965 to 1971, he edited three volumes of Smith's work for Arkham House, a task he would reprise for Pocket Books a decade later.

In 1969, he married Gloria Kathleen Braly, and started giving dramatic readings shortly thereafter at universities and other institutions, almost always incorporating material by Smith and Spenser. His poetry has continued to appear in a variety of weird fiction and speculative poetry-oriented journals.

Sidney-Fryer's verse is marked by a strong imagination, and a Francophilic focus.  He is a strong believer in "pure poetry," and practices formalist verse, having developing his own specific poetic form: the 'Spenserian stanza-sonnet'.

He remains a prolific historian of 19th century ballet, and is an expert on the ballet theatre of the romantic era.

Bibliography

 A Checklist of the Ballet Scores of Cesare Pugni (Enciclopedia dello Spettacolo, Vol VIII, Rome, 1961).
 (Ed.) Poems in Prose by Clark Ashton Smith (Sauk City, WI: Arkham House, 1965).
 (Ed.) Other Dimensions by Clark Ashton Smith (Sauk City, WI: Arkham House, 1970).
 (Ed.) Selected Poems by Clark Ashton Smith (Sauk City, WI: Arkham House, 1971).
 Songs and Sonnets Atlantean (Sauk City, WI: Arkham House, 1971).
 The Last of the Great Romantic Poets (Albuquerque, NM: Silver Scarab Press, 1973). Nonfiction work on Clark Ashton Smith.
 (Comp.) Emperor of Dreams: A Clark Ashton Smith Bibliography (West Kingston, RI: Donald M. Grant, 1978).
 (Ed.) The Black Book of Clark Ashton Smith (Sauk City, WI: Arkham House, 1979).
 (Ed.) A Vision of Doom by Ambrose Bierce (West Kingston, RI: Donald M. Grant, 1980).
 (Ed.) The City of the Singing Flame by Clark Ashton Smith (New York: Pocket/Timescape, 1981).
 (Ed.) The Last Incantation by Clark Ashton Smith (New York: Pocket/Timescape, 1982).
 (Ed.) The Monster of the Prophecy by Clark Ashton Smith (New York: Pocket/Timescape, 1983).
 (Ed.) Strange Shadows: The Uncollected Fiction & Essays of Clark Ashton Smith (with Steve Behrends and Rah Hoffman; New York: Greenwood Press, 1989).
 (Ed.) The Devil's Notebook: Collected Epigrams and Pensées of Clark Ashton Smith (Mercer Island, WA: Starmont House, Inc., 1990).
 (Ed.) The Hashish-Eater by Clark Ashton Smith (Privately issued, Sacramento, CA, 1990).
 Clark Ashton Smith: The Sorcerer Departs (West Hills, CA : Tsathoggua Press, 1997).
 Songs and Sonnets Atlantean: The Second Series (Holicong, PA: Wildside Press, 2003).
 (Trans.) Gaspard de la Nuit: Fantasies in the manner of Rembrandt and Callot by Aloysius Bertrand (Encino, CA: Black Coat Press, 2004).
 Songs and Sonnets Atlantean: The Third Series (Los Angeles, CA: Phosphor Lantern Press, 2005).
 The Sorcerer Departs: Clark Ashton Smith (1893–1961) (Dole, France: Silver Key Press, 2007).
 The Atlantis Fragments. (Hippocampus Press, 2009) [Omnibus ed of the three volumes of Songs and Sonnets Atlantean; 300 copy hc limited edition, and pbk).
 Hobgoblin Apollo: The Autobiography of Donald Sidney-Fryer (New York: Hippocampus Press, 2016). . Odds and Ends, a hundred-page collection comprising Donald Sidney-Fryer's latest poems, the vast majority previously unpublished, is included as an appendix.
 Aesthetics Ho! Essays on Art, Literature, and Theatre (New York: Hippocampus Press, 2017). .
 The Case of the Light Fantastic Toe: The Romantic Ballet and Signor Maestro Cesare Pugni, as well as their Survival by Means of Tsarist Russia [5 volumes] (Los Angeles, CA: Phosphoror Lantern Press, 2018).
 A King Called Arthor and Other Morceaux (New York: Hippocampus Press, 2020). .

Further reading
Darrell Schweitzer. "An Interview with Donald Sidney-Fryer". The New York Review of Science Fiction'' (Aug 2010)

External links
 Donald Sidney-Fryer
 Donald Sidney-Fryer: The Last of the Courtly Poets
 A Donald Sidney-Fryer Bibliography by Alan Gullette 

1934 births
Living people
American male poets
People from New Bedford, Massachusetts